Jacob Obande was a Nigerian businessman from the old Northern region. He was a minister of state in charge of the Nigerian Army during the Nigerian First Republic. In 1959, he was the parliamentary secretary to Prime Minister Tafawa Balewa.

References
K. W. J. Post; The Nigerian Federal Election of 1959: Politics and Administration in a Developing Political System. Oxford University Press, 1963, p54-55.

Year of birth missing
Year of death missing
Federal ministers of Nigeria
20th-century Nigerian businesspeople